The 2018 Virgin Australia All-Australian team represents the best performed Australian Football League (AFL) players during the 2018 season. It was announced on 29 August as a complete Australian rules football team of 22 players. The team is honorary and does not play any games.

Selection panel
The selection panel for the 2018 All-Australian team consisted of chairman Gillon McLachlan, Kevin Bartlett, Luke Darcy, Danny Frawley, Steve Hocking, Glen Jakovich, Chris Johnson, Cameron Ling, Matthew Richardson and Warren Tredrea.

Team

Initial squad
The initial 40-man All-Australian squad was announced on 27 August.

Final team
Minor premiers Richmond had the most selections with four.  forward Lance Franklin, who achieved selection for a record-equalling eighth time, was announced as the All-Australian captain, with  midfielder and six-time All-Australian Patrick Dangerfield announced as vice-captain. The team saw ten players selected in an All-Australian team for the first time in their careers and included only four players from clubs not competing in that year's finals series.

Note: the position of coach in the All-Australian team is traditionally awarded to the coach of the premiership team.

References

All-Australian team